Polygrammodes hyalomaculata is a moth in the family Crambidae. It was described by Paul Dognin in 1908. It is found in Peru and Guatemala.

Subspecies
Polygrammodes hyalomaculata hyalomaculata (Peru)
Polygrammodes hyalomaculata septentrionalis Munroe, 1958 (Guatemala)

References

Spilomelinae
Moths described in 1908
Moths of Central America
Moths of South America